Campbell Miller may refer to:

 Stretch Miller (Campbell A. Miller, 1910–1972), American sportscaster
 Campbell J. Miller, Canadian judge